Mazhar Kerem Özyeğen (born 26 September 1977 in İstanbul, Turkey) is the lead guitarist and one of the backing singers in the Turkish rock group Mor ve Ötesi. Previously played and sang in punk-rock group Spark, and later in a jazz-rock group Crusiana.

Biography
Mazhar Kerem Özyeğen was born on 26 September 1977 in İstanbul. His mother's name is Ayla Özyeğen (he devoted latest album of group Mor ve Ötesi – Büyük Düşler to her), his father's name is Atilla Özyeğen.

Kerem studied International Relations at Girne American University.

Creative activity
In the period 1993—1996 Kerem was in the group Spark, which he founded with friends while he was in high school. There he was a guitarist and vocalist. The group was strongly influenced by bands such as Nirvana, Sex Pistols, Soundgarden and Rage Against the Machine. Nevertheless, the group members themselves wrote the music and lyrics. Kerem gave a few concerts and recorded a few demo songs.

Soon he switched to another group, Siddhartha. The team performed in the style of psychedelic rock. In 1996, they received second prize at a music contest called Roxy Müzik Günleri. He participated in recording their first album, issued in 1998.

In 1996 Kerem continued his musical career with the jazz rock group Crusiana. In this group he sang and played the bass. With Crusiana he participated in the finals Tuborg Rock Festivali 1996. At this competition, he met with members of another group of finalists, Kerem Kabadayı and Harun Tekin. In 1998 Kerem left Crusiana.

The greater part of 1998 he sang and played guitar in the Istanbul bars Ust ve Alt Kemancı with rock'n'roll group Taski, who played music Beatles, Jimi Hendrix and Rolling Stones. By the end of that year he joined the group of Mor ve Otesi, playing in the style of alternative rock, replacing the guitarist and vocalist Derin Esmer. In the composition of the team Kerem is now. He is a lead guitarist and backing vocalist.

External links
 

1977 births
Living people
Mor ve Ötesi members
Turkish rock guitarists
Eurovision Song Contest entrants for Turkey
Eurovision Song Contest entrants of 2008